United States House of Representatives Page Program was a program run by the United States House of Representatives, under the office of the Clerk of the House, in which high school students acted as non-partisan federal employees in the House of Representatives, providing supplemental administrative support to House operations in a variety of capacities in Washington, D.C., at the United States Capitol. The program ended in 2011, although the Senate Page program continued. Pages served within the U.S. House of Representatives for over 180 years.

Program history

As early as 1827, males were hired to serve as messengers in Congress. In the Congressional Record (formerly known as the Congressional Globe), the term "page" was first used in 1839 and referred to as a youth employed as a personal attendant to a person of high rank. However, some sources claim that pages have served as messengers since the very first Congress in 1789. The practice of using pages as a messaging service stemmed out of a tradition that dated back to the Middle Ages.

The first African-American page, Alfred Q. Powell, was appointed in 1871 by Charles H. Porter (R-VA), with recommendations from William Henry Harrison Stowell (R-VA) and James H. Platt Jr. (R-VA).

In 1965, Paul Findley (R-IL) appointed Frank Mitchell as the second African-American page to serve in the House of Representatives. In 1973, House Speaker Carl Albert (D-OK) appointed Felda Looper as the first female page in the House of Representatives.

Following a scandal in 1983, the Page Residence Hall was established and Congress required that all pages be at least 16 years old and juniors in high school. Previous to that, the age range of pages was 14 to 18 and no type of housing was provided.

1954 Puerto Rican Nationalist shooting
On March 1, 1954, members of the Puerto Rican Nationalist Party opened gunfire on the House Chamber during debate from the viewing gallery and injured five members of Congress. In this U.S. Capitol shooting incident (1954) Congressman Alvin Morell Bentley (R-MI) was seriously wounded by a bullet fired by Lolita Lebrón. Six pages carried Congressman Bentley off the house floor. The famous photograph of pages carrying Congressman Bentley can be found in the Page Residence Hall as well as the Republican Cloakroom and Page School; two of the pages in the picture later became members of Congress: Paul Kanjorski (D-PA) and Bill Emerson (R-MO), for whom the main assembly hall in the Page School was named. A bullet hole from the attack can still be found directly above what was the Democratic page desk.

Scandals

1983 sex and drug scandal

In 1983, it came to light that Representatives Dan Crane (R-IL) and Gerry Studds (D-MA) had engaged in sexual relationships with 17-year-old congressional pages. In Crane's case, it was a 1980 relationship with a female page and in Studds's case, it was a 1973 relationship with a male page. Because Washington, D.C.'s age of consent is 16, no crimes were committed. The House Ethics Committee reprimanded both on July 14, 1983. However, Representative Newt Gingrich demanded the expulsion of both Congressmen. On July 20, the House voted for censure, the first time that censure had been imposed for sexual misconduct. Crane tearfully apologized for his transgression and lost his bid for reelection in 1984. Studds refused to apologize, and he continued to be reelected until his retirement in 1997.

The House Ethics Committee probe found that James Howarth, who had supervised the House pages until December 1982, when he was given other duties, had had sex in 1980 with one of his 17-year-old female wards. The report also accused Howarth of buying cocaine in the House's Democratic cloakroom, possibly from another House staffer. He resigned on November 15, 1983, prior to formal House action. The Majority Assistant Cloakroom Manager Robert Yesh, who was accused of selling and using cocaine and using marijuana and cocaine with House pages, and pleaded guilty to two federal misdemeanors on March 9, 1983, resigned on April 15, 1983. An employee in the Doorkeeper's Office, James Beattie, was accused of selling and using cocaine, resigned on May 16, 1983, and pleaded guilty to two federal misdemeanors on July 28, 1983.

1996 alcohol scandal
In 1996, five pages were dismissed for alcohol use.

2002 marijuana dismissals
In 2002, 11 pages were dismissed for using marijuana. The incident occurred after a female page who had family in the Washington, D.C., area invited fellow pages to her home, where marijuana was used while the teenagers were unsupervised. That page later brought drugs to the dormitory and this was reported to authorities.

2006 Mark Foley scandal

The Mark Foley scandal involved the former Republican congressman Mark Foley of Florida, who sent emails and instant messages of a sexual nature to several former congressional pages. Page Board Chairman John Shimkus said "that in late 2005 he learned — through information passed along by Rodney Alexander's office — about an e-mail exchange in which Foley asked about the youngster's well-being after Hurricane Katrina, and requested a photograph."

After this revelation, other congressional pages came forward with similar stories about Congressman Foley. Graphic conversations between Foley and several pages using AOL Instant Messenger were released by ABC News on September 29, 2006; Foley resigned the same day. United States Secretary of Transportation Ray LaHood (R-IL) later suggested suspending the program.

Rep. Sue Kelly, who was Chairwoman of the Page Board from 1998 to 2001, was caught up in the scandal when three pages said she was aware of Foley's inappropriate attention toward pages during her tenure.

House Page Board
The House Page Board was created in response to the 1983 scandal. It originally consisted of two members of the majority party, one member of the minority party, and several officers of the House. In reaction to the Mark Foley scandal, the composition of the board changed. It consisted of two members of the majority party, two members of the minority party, the Sergeant at Arms, the Clerk of the House, the parent of a former page, and a former page. These changes were implemented as part of the House Page Board Revision Act of 2007.
(). Chairpersons of the Board included Sue W. Kelly (R-NY) (1998–2001), John Shimkus (R-IL) (2001–2006), and Dale Kildee (D-MI) (2007 – 2011).

End of the program
On August 8, 2011, Speaker John Boehner (R-OH) and then-Minority Leader Nancy Pelosi (D-CA) announced in a joint statement that the House would end the page program, saying technological advancements made page services unnecessary in light of the cost of the program, which was more than $5 million ($69,000-$80,000 per page). "Pages, once stretched to the limit delivering large numbers of documents and other packages between the U.S. Capitol and House office buildings, are today rarely called upon for such services, since most documents are now transmitted electronically", they said. "We have great appreciation for the unique role that pages have played in the history and traditions of the House of Representatives. This decision was not easy, but it was necessary due to the prohibitive cost of the program and advances in technology that have rendered most page-provided services no longer essential to the smooth functioning of the House." The Senate Page program continued.

Selection
In the modern era, pages were nominated by representatives based upon a highly competitive application process. Pages served during the spring and fall semesters of their junior year, as well as during summer sessions before or after their junior year. Prospective House pages were nominated by a representative or congressional delegate (pages have come from all 50 U.S. states as well as the District of Columbia, Puerto Rico, Guam, U.S. Virgin Islands, and American Samoa). It was a general rule that only one nominee was permitted per representative, except for party leadership. Each group of pages, typically referred to as a "class", typically consisted of between 45 and 75 students, with the summer sessions being larger.

Page life

Work
The page's work life revolved around the United States Capitol in Washington, D.C. Officially a division of the Office of the Clerk, the Page Program existed primarily to provide supplement support to various House offices. Two full-time, adult employees of the Office of the Clerk served as "chief pages" (commonly referred to as work bosses), although some holders of this position self-titled themselves as "page supervisors" to avoid misidentification. These employees were not partisan, although there was one Republican Supervisor and one Democratic Supervisor to direct the day-to-day operations of the page groups and provide front-line adult supervision. Additionally, the Office of the Clerk employed a page coordinator to coordinate all aspects of page life, school, work, and dormitory and handle administrative responsibilities.

Page responsibilities included taking statements from members of Congress after speeches (for the Congressional Record), printing and delivering vote reports to various offices, tending members' personal needs while on the floor of the House, managing phones in the cloakrooms, and ringing the bells for votes.

For work purposes, pages were divided into two groups, Republican and Democratic, based upon the party affiliation of their sponsoring Member. On both sides of the aisle, the vast majority of pages were based on the Floor of the House and serve as runners. These runners were dispatched to various House offices, typically taking advantage of the United States Capitol subway system to transport various documents by overseer or desk pages. The overseer pages were responsible for ensuring that all inbound call requests were met as quickly as possible and that the workload was distributed as even as possible among the runners. A fair number of dispatches involve the runners going to Congressional offices to bring proposed legislation to the cloakrooms. At the cloakrooms, a cloakroom page, or a cloakroom manager would sign for receipt of the legislation. It was then brought to the bill hopper, or simply, the hopper (a repository box on the rostrum on the Floor) for official submission to the Clerk of the House.

Pages also delivered correspondence to and from the respective Cloakrooms as well as offices in the Capitol complex. Pages also distributed American flags that were to be flown over the Capitol.

Speaker's pages served solely the Office of the Speaker, conducting tasks that ranged from fetching beverages and snacks for the Speaker and his or her official guests to helping to compose internal memoranda. The assignment of speaker's pages was suspended in September 2007.

Documentarian pages, or "docs," were selected from the group of pages in the majority party and were perhaps the two most visible pages. Seated to the stage-left of the rostrum, these pages had several important responsibilities. When the House gaveled into session, the documentarians were responsible for raising the U.S. flag on the roof of the south wing of the Capitol, officially notifying the public that the House was in session. At the close of the day, when the House adjourned, they returned to the roof and lowered the flag. Additionally, they were responsible for activating the bell system which rang throughout the House side of the United States Capitol Complex, notifying Representatives that the House was in session or that there was a vote. Also, they provided assistance to the various clerks and congressional parliamentarians seated at the rostrum, as well as the Speaker Pro Tempore. Although highly independent, these pages fell under the de facto supervision of the Timekeeper (Clerk to the Parliamentarian). Docs worked in pairs, until the House adjourned. They were present during Special Orders, a time when a member may speak for one hour on any subject, which were conducted after the day's legislative business ended.

Each party cloakroom had cloakroom pages, or "cloakies," who provide direct assistance to Members of Congress when on the floor and assisted the cloakroom staff. Cloakroom pages answered the cloakrooms phones and transfer the calls to the booths in the cloakroom. When a congressional staffer wanted to talk with a member, cloakroom pages went on the floor and notified that member. These pages also conveyed messages between representatives. Additionally, cloakroom pages helped maintain official cloakroom records of daily proceedings, including bills before the House for debate and votes. Miscellaneous tasks included cleaning the phone booths provided in the cloakroom; assisting the cloakroom managers in answering phone calls; during votes, waking up representatives who were asleep; and making sure that every member present remembered to vote. These pages fell under the de facto supervision of the managers of the respective cloakrooms.

Uniform

House pages wore uniforms consisting of a navy blazer, white dress shirt, tie, lapel pin, name-tag, gray slacks for boys and gray skirts or slacks for girls, and black shoes. Until the early 1960s, pages were required to wear suits with knickers as pants, long after the style had become obsolete.

School

Pages serving during the school year attended the House Page School, located on the attic floor of the Thomas Jefferson Building of the Library of Congress. The school was accredited by the Middle States Association of Colleges and Secondary Schools. Pages attended school from 6:45 to 10:00 a.m. The only exception was for pages who worked past 10 p.m. the evening prior.

Housing

Prior to 1972, pages resided at various locations around the District of Columbia. Beginning in 1972, pages resided at the now-demolished O'Neill House Office Building at 301 C Street SE, Washington, DC 20003 (also known as House Annex One). In preparation for that building's demolition, pages resided in a former dormitory for Catholic nuns working at nearby Providence Hospital. From 2001 until the end of the program, pages resided at the Page Residence Hall (PRH) at 501 First Street SE, Washington, DC 20003.

Notable pages
 William Lawrence Scott - 1840–1846 (politician and businessman)
 Gilbert M. Woodward - (U.S. Representative)
 Richard W. Townshend (U.S. Representative)
 William B. Cushing - 1856 (naval hero of the American Civil War) 
 John E. Pillsbury - 1861–1862 (naval commander and geographer)
 John Dingell - 1938–1941 (U.S. Representative)
 Charles Bennett (U.S. Representative)
 Brad Dye - 1950 (Lieutenant Governor of Mississippi)
 David Pryor - 1951 (U.S. Senator and Representative)
 Donald F. Munson - 1953 (Maryland State Senator)
 Paul E. Kanjorski - 1953–1955 (U.S. Representative)
 Robert Bauman - 1953–1955 (U.S. Representative) 
 Bill Emerson - 1953–1955 (U.S. Representative)
 Jed Johnson Jr. - ?–1957 (U.S. Representative)
 Ander Crenshaw - June 1961 (U.S. Representative)
 Douglas H. Bosco - ?–1963 (U.S. Representative)
 Rush D. Holt Jr. - Summers 1963 & 1964 (U.S. Representative)
 Thomas M. Davis - 1963–1967 (U.S. Representative)
 Richard Armstrong - (Guggenheim Museum director)
 Andrew Napolitano - 1966 (New Jersey Superior Court judge; contributor to Fox News)
 Bill Owens - (Governor of Colorado)
 Roger Wicker - 1967 (U.S. Representative and Senator)
 Jamie Dupree - 1970 (broadcaster)
 Bill Gates - Summer 1972 (Founder/CEO of Microsoft)
 David Beasley - (Governor of South Carolina; Executive Director of the World Food Programme)
 Maura Connelly - 1975–1977 (diplomat)
 R. Donahue Peebles - 1976–1978 (entrepreneur)
 Jonathan Turley - 1977–78 (law professor, legal commentator, litigator)
 Dave Hunt - 1985 (Oregon House Speaker)
 Dan Boren - Summer 1989 (U.S. Representative)
 Seth Andrew - 1994–1995 (educator)
 Abby Finkenauer - 2006 (U.S. Representative)

See also
Page of the United States Senate
Canadian House of Commons Page Program
Canadian Senate Page Program

References

External links
Democracy's Messengers documentary
Oral History of the U.S. House of Representatives: Frank Mitchell The first African-American Page gives a first-hand account of his service, 1965-1966.
Oral History of the U.S. House of Representatives: Bill Goodwin Information about the daily routine and education of House Pages (1953–1955), as well as an eyewitness account of the March 1, 1954 shooting in the House Chamber.
Oral History of the U.S. House of Representatives: Glenn Rupp A first-hand account of life as a House Page in the 1930s.
United States House Page Association of America
U.S. House Page Alumni Association
Congressional Page Association
Congressional Page Class 2001
What's the deal with ... Congressional Pages? From TheCapitol.Net
U.S. Capitol Page Alumni Association

Page